Rimpton is a village and civil parish  north-west of Sherborne, and  north-east of Yeovil on a tributary of the River Parret in the South Somerset district of Somerset, England.

History

The parish of Rimpton was part of the Horethorne hundred until about 1735, and from then it was considered part of Taunton Deane hundred, although it was some distance from the rest of the hundred.  The parish was part of Sherborne Poor Law Union from 1835 to 1896, although it remained part of Somerset.

Governance

The parish council has responsibility for local issues, including setting an annual precept (local rate) to cover the council's operating costs and producing annual accounts for public scrutiny. The parish council evaluates local planning applications and works with the local police, district council officers, and neighbourhood watch groups on matters of crime, security, and traffic. The parish council's role also includes initiating projects for the maintenance and repair of parish facilities, as well as consulting with the district council on the maintenance, repair, and improvement of highways, drainage, footpaths, public transport, and street cleaning. Conservation matters (including trees and listed buildings) and environmental issues are also the responsibility of the council.

The village falls within the Non-metropolitan district of South Somerset, which was formed on 1 April 1974 under the Local Government Act 1972, having previously been part of Yeovil Rural District. The district council is responsible for local planning and building control, local roads, council housing, environmental health, markets and fairs, refuse collection and recycling, cemeteries and crematoria, leisure services, parks, and tourism.

Rimpton is part of the electoral ward of Camelot.

Somerset County Council is responsible for running the largest and most expensive local services such as education, social services, libraries, main roads, public transport, policing and fire services, trading standards, waste disposal and strategic planning.

It is also part of the Somerton and Frome county constituency represented in the House of Commons of the Parliament of the United Kingdom. It elects one member of parliament (MP) by the first past the post system of election.

Religious sites

The Church of St Mary dates from the early 13th century and has been designated by English Heritage as a Grade I listed building.

References

External links

 Rimpton in the Victoria County History

Villages in South Somerset
Civil parishes in Somerset